Gentiana setigera is a species of gentian known by the common name Mendocino gentian. It is native to southern Oregon and northern California where it grows in wet places in the California Coast Ranges. It grows in serpentine soils.

Description
This is a low perennial herb with stems running along the ground and reaching up to about 40 centimeters in length. Leaves are spoon-shaped near the base and oval-shaped and paired further along the stem.

Flowers appear singly or in inflorescences of a few flowers. Each flower is bell-shaped and bright blue with a speckled white center. The four to five lobes of the corolla are diamond-shaped and between them are sinus appendages that end in thready projections. The fruit is a capsule containing winged seeds.

References

External links

Plant of the Week: Gentiana setigera. United States Forest Service.
Gentiana setigera. In: Jepson Flora Project (eds.) Jepson eFlora. Accessed 9 July 2017.
Gentiana setigera. Inventory of Rare and Endangered Plants. California Native Plant Society.
Gentiana setigera. CalPhotos.

setigera
Flora of California
Flora of Oregon
Flora of the Klamath Mountains
Natural history of the California Coast Ranges